Pastores is a municipality in the province of Salamanca,  western Spain, part of the autonomous community of Castile-Leon.

The municipality is formed by the town of Pastores and the uninhabited Cuadrados, which occupies a total area of 12.69 km² and according to the demographic data collected in 2017, it has a population of 54.

The village lies 764 meters above sea level and the postal code is 37512.

Demographics

References

Municipalities in the Province of Salamanca